The 5th Street Gym (also known as World Famous 5th St. Gym) is a boxing gym in Miami Beach, Florida. Now located in an alley on 5th Street, the gym originally operated from 1950 until its closure in 1993. The original owner trained notable fighters including Muhammad Ali. The gym was frequented by celebrities. Today, the gym is frequented by a variety of people, including notable fighters and local residents.

References 

1950 establishments in Florida
Boxing gyms in the United States
Boxing in Florida
Buildings and structures in Miami Beach, Florida
Sports in Florida
Sports venues in Miami-Dade County, Florida